Ali Shirinov (born on 9 August 1998) is an Azerbaijani football midfielder who plays for Zira in the Azerbaijan Premier League.

Club career
On 24 February 2019, Shirinov made his debut in the Azerbaijan Premier League for Neftçi Baku match against Sabail.

References

External links
 

1998 births
Living people
Association football midfielders
Azerbaijani footballers
Azerbaijani expatriate footballers
Expatriate footballers in Latvia
Azerbaijan Premier League players
Latvian Higher League players
Neftçi PFK players
BFC Daugavpils players
Zira FK players
Azerbaijani expatriate sportspeople in Latvia